United States Naval Hospital may refer to Naval Hospitals:

In the United States
 Naval Health Clinic New England
 Naval Medical Research Center

 Banning General Hospital, a military hospital in Banning, California
 Naval Hospital Lemoore at Naval Air Station Lemoore, California
 Naval Medical Center San Diego, informally referred to as "Balboa Hospital", in California
 Naval Hospital Jacksonville, at Naval Air Station Jacksonville, in Jacksonville, Florida
 Naval Hospital Pensacola, in Florida
 Captain James A. Lovell Federal Health Care Center, in Chicago, Illinois
 Naval Health Clinic Annapolis, at United States Naval Academy in Maryland
 Walter Reed National Military Medical Center, Bethesda, Maryland
 Naval Hospital Camp Lejeune, in North Carolina
 United States Naval Hospital Beaufort, in Port Royal, South Carolina
 Naval Medical Center Portsmouth, in Portsmouth, Virginia
 Old Naval Hospital, in Washington, D.C.
 Naval Hospital Bremerton, in Bremerton, Washington

In other countries
 Naval Hospital Yokosuka Japan
 U.S. Naval Hospital, Subic Bay, Philippines

Former Naval Hospitals in California
 McCormack General Hospital (World War 2 only), in Pasadena
 Naval Hospital Corona (World War 2 only), in Norco
 Naval Convalescent Hospital, Santa Cruz
 Yosemite Naval Convalescent Hospital at the Ahwahnee Hotel (World War 2 only)
 San Leandro Naval Hospital (World War 2 only)
 Long Beach Naval Hospital (1964-1994), now Long Beach Towne Center
 Naval Hospital Long Beach (1941-1950), now a VA health center
 Naval Hospital Oakland (1942-1996), also known as Oak Knoll Naval Hospital
 Naval Convalescent Hospital Beaumont
 Naval Convalescent Hospital Arrowhead Springs
 Alameda Naval Hospital (1941-1975)